Olena Tsyos (born 9 May 1990, Lutsk) is a Ukrainian track cyclist. At the 2012 Summer Olympics, she competed in the Women's team sprint for the national team.  The team finished in 4th.

Major results
2013
1st Sprint, Grand Prix of Russian Helicopters
1st 500m Time Trial, Copa Internacional de Pista
2014
Grand Prix Galichyna
1st Sprint
1st Team Sprint (with Olena Starikova)
1st 500m Time Trial
2nd Keirin
3rd Keirin, Panevezys
Grand Prix Minsk
3rd Keirin
3rd Sprint

References

External links 
 

Ukrainian female cyclists
1990 births
Sportspeople from Lutsk
Living people
Olympic cyclists of Ukraine
Cyclists at the 2012 Summer Olympics
Ukrainian track cyclists
Sportspeople from Volyn Oblast